Secrets of Midland Heights is an American nighttime soap opera which ran on CBS from December 6, 1980 to January 24, 1981 for eight episodes, with two more episodes left unaired. Produced after the success of Dallas, Lorimar Productions, likewise, produced the new serial for CBS.

Secrets of Midland Heights was aimed at the teen audience, and featured romantic triangles and secrets among the teens and their parents who populated a fictional midwestern college town called Midland Heights. Aired on Saturday night at 10 PM EST/9 PM Central, the series never found an audience and was canceled after eight episodes.

The show resembled a dark, 1980s-style Peyton Place, both dealing with hidden secrets and scandalous affairs in a small town. Lisa Rogers (Linda Hamilton) carried on with college jock Burt Carroll (Lorenzo Lamas) while also seeing fraternity jerk Mark (Bill Thornbury); good girl heiress Ann Dulles (Doran Clark) secretly dated high school dropout John (Jim Youngs); Holly Wheeler (played first by Linda Grovernor and then by Marilyn Jones) wanted to lose her virginity to her boyfriend Teddy Welsh (Daniel Zippi), but the teens were shocked to discover her mother Dorothy (Bibi Besch) was having an affair with Teddy's father Nathan (Robert Hogan).

There were also power struggles between the wealthy Millington family, consisting of leading citizen Margaret and her son Guy, and the equally wealthy and powerful Wheelers.  The Millington family had been one of the founding families of Midland Heights.

The show was produced by David Jacobs, Lee Rich and Michael Filerman, all of whom were connected in production to other serial dramas like Flamingo Road and Knots Landing.

When Secrets of Midland Heights was pulled from the schedule, the producers stated that the show would be retooled and make a return in some form. Many of the same performers and production staff returned to ABC the following season in the different serial King's Crossing, which similarly had a short run.

After the demise of the series, actor Lorenzo Lamas would join the cast of the soap, Falcon Crest playing Lance Cumson, the grandson of the series main schemer, Angela Channing (Jane Wyman).

Cast

Episodes

References

Bruce B. Morris, Prime Time Network Serials: Episode Guides, Casts and Credits for 37 Continuing Television Dramas, 1964-1993, McFarland and Company, 1997.

1980 American television series debuts
1981 American television series endings
American television soap operas
American primetime television soap operas
Television series by Warner Bros. Television Studios
English-language television shows